Crisanto Mendoza de los Reyes Avenue, formerly known as the General Trias–Amadeo–Tagaytay Road and also known as Tejero-General Trias-Amadeo-Tagaytay Road, is a two-to-four lane, tertiary highway traversing through the central towns and cities of the province of Cavite, Philippines. It connects the city of General Trias to the city of Tagaytay and acts as a secondary road for the Aguinaldo Highway.

The entire stretch is named after Crisanto Mendoza de los Reyes, one of the heroes of the 1872 Cavite mutiny, since the passage of Republic Act No. 9477 in 2007. Its portions in General Trias are also alternatively known as General Trias Drive and Governor Ferrer Drive or Governor Luis Ferrer Drive, respectively,

Route description
The northern terminus of the highway is at the Antero Soriano Highway in Barangay Tejero, General Trias as the southern continuation of N401 (General Trias Drive). From there, it takes the name General Trias Drive. It then turns south at the población as Governor Ferrer Drive or Governor Luis Ferrer Drive until its intersection with Governor's Drive in Barangay Manggahan. It then proceeds Amadeo and ends at the Tagaytay–Nasugbu Highway in Tagaytay.

Intersections

References 

Roads in Cavite